Guy Janiszewski (born 24 January 1959) is a Belgian former professional racing cyclist. He rode in two editions of the Tour de France and one edition of the Vuelta a España.

References

External links

1959 births
Living people
Belgian male cyclists
Sportspeople from Liège
Cyclists from Liège Province